The 2022 Atlanta United FC season will be the seventh season of Atlanta United FC's existence, and the fifteenth year that a professional soccer club from Atlanta, Georgia competing in the top division of American soccer. Atlanta United will play their home games at Mercedes-Benz Stadium. Outside of MLS, they will compete in the 2023 U.S. Open Cup and also be participating in the 2023 Leagues Cup for the first time.

Club

Player movement

In

Out

Loan in

Loan out

SuperDraft picks 
Draft picks are not automatically signed to the team roster.

Atlanta traded the 7th overall pick to Real Salt Lake for $175,000 GAM

Competitions

Non-competitive

Preseason exhibitions

MLS

Standings

Eastern Conference

Overall

Matches

U.S. Open Cup

Atlanta United will enter the Open Cup at the Third Round.

Leagues Cup

South 3

Statistics

Appearances and goals

|-
! colspan=16 style=background:#dcdcdc; text-align:center|Goalkeepers

|-
! colspan=16 style=background:#dcdcdc; text-align:center|Defenders

|-
! colspan=16 style=background:#dcdcdc; text-align:center|Midfielders

|-
! colspan=16 style=background:#dcdcdc; text-align:center|Forwards

|-
! colspan=16 style=background:#dcdcdc; text-align:center|Players who have played for Atlanta United this season but have left the club

|-
|}

References

Atlanta United FC seasons
Atlanta United
Atlanta United
Atlanta United FC